Sumo Cyco is a Canadian rock band from Hamilton, Ontario, consisting of lead vocalist Skye Sweetnam, Matt "MD13" Drake (guitar/vocals), Oscar Anesetti (bass/vocals), and Joey Muha (drums). The band launched in March 2011 and has released three albums, twenty-six singles, and twenty-four official music videos.

Biography
Sumo Cyco first appeared as a punk-metal female-fronted band in Toronto, Canada in 2011.

The band currently consists of Skye Sweetnam (lead vocals), Matt Drake (guitars/vocals), Oscar Anesetti (bass/vocals), and  Joey Muha (drums).

2011–2013: Formation
Sumo Cyco launched in March 2011 and had their first show, opening for Hollywood Undead, in April of that year, performing to a crowd of a thousand. Sumo Cyco has also shared the stage with Coal Chamber, Filter, Life of Agony, Finger Eleven, The Salads, and Raggadeath with Michie Mee. Their songs have been mixed by Jag Tanna (I Mother Earth), Julius "Juice" Butty (Alexisonfire), and Matt DeMatteo (Big Wreck), among others. One song, "Interceptor", was featured on YouTuber Ray William Johnson's channel, garnering over five million views. Sumo Cyco has a strong presence online and directs both their own music videos and promotional films.

The band mixes influences from the likes of System of a Down, Rob Zombie, and No Doubt. Musically, their sound blends heavy metal guitars, blast beats, and dancehall rhythms.

The group won Best Female-Fronted Band at the Toronto Independent Music Awards of 2012. They also won at Indie Week Toronto, October 20, 2013, and attended Indie Week Ireland in Limerick in April 2014.

During this period, the band released seven singles, all of which were launched with music videos, and all self-directed and self-produced.

2014–2016: Touring and Lost in Cyco City
In October 2013, the Sumo Cyco won in the Indie Week Toronto and attended Indie Week Ireland in April 2014. Using the opportunity of being overseas, the band set up their first international tour, which they called Lost in Ireland & the UK, to promote their material to an international market. They toured various cities across Ireland, Scotland, and England.

On June 10, 2014, the band released their first album, Lost in Cyco City. They later toured various countries in Europe, including the UK, Italy, Austria, and Slovakia, on their No Mercy tour, which took place in mid- to late-April.

On March 10, 2015, Sumo Cyco announced that they had signed with TKO / The Kirby Organization Booking Agency for worldwide representation. TKO are known for booking hard rock and heavy metal acts such as Motörhead, Anthrax, and Sevendust.

In February 2016, touring drummer Andy Joseph left the band for personal reasons and was replaced by new touring drummer Matt Trozzi.

In April 2016, Sumo Cyco's song "Fighter" was announced as the theme song for the World Darts Association's (WDA) 2016 Merseyside Open.

2017–2019: Touring and Opus Mar
On March 31, 2017, it was announced via Twitter that Sumo Cyco would release their sophomore album, titled Opus Mar. The record includes a guest appearance by Benji Webbe of Skindred on the single "Move Mountains," released on February 1, 2017.

In 2017, Sumo Cyco replaced Ludovico Technique in its tour with The Birthday Massacre and Army of the Universe. During this tour, Oscar Anesetti of The Rabid Whole filled in for Ken Corke.

Sumo Cyco opened up the main stage for The Offspring at the Sound of Music outdoor festival on June 10, 2017.

In October 2017, the band was able to travel to New Zealand to open for Devilskin on their seven-date cross-country tour.

Starting on April 25, 2018, Sumo Cyco opened for Butcher Babies and Nonpoint on their co-headline tour.

On June 14, Sumo Cyco played the Kerrang! Avalanche Stage at Download Festival 2019.

In September 2019, they joined Jinjer and The Browning for a 44-date tour of North America.

In December 2019, Sumo Cyco announced that they would be opening for Wednesday 13 and The 69 Eyes on a tour through the US, from January 24 through February 22, 2020.

2020–present: Napalm Records and Initiation
In January 2020, the band announced their signing to Napalm Records. They released their third album, Initiation, on May 7, 2021. A deluxe version of Initiation was released on October 8, 2021, featuring the new single "Sun Eater".

Matt Trozzi departed from the band in 2021. He was replaced by Joey Muha.

Band timeline

Discography

Studio albums
 Lost in Cyco City (2014)
 Opus Mar (2017)
 Initiation (2021)

Singles

References

External links
 
 

Musical groups from Hamilton, Ontario
Canadian alternative metal musical groups
Canadian alternative rock groups
Musical quartets
Musical groups established in 2011
Skye Sweetnam
2011 establishments in Ontario
Female-fronted musical groups